The Belarusian Women's Cup (Belarusian: Кубка Беларуси) is the annual cup competition of women's football teams in Belarus. It was first contested in 1992.

List of finals
The list of finals:

References

External links
Cup at BFF, Belarusian Football Federation
Cup at women.soccerway.com

Belarus
Women's football competitions in Belarus
Recurring sporting events established in 1992
Women